In the field of molecular biology, enterotoxin type B, also known as Staphylococcal enterotoxin B (SEB), is an enterotoxin produced by the  gram-positive bacteria Staphylococcus aureus. It is a common cause of food poisoning, with severe diarrhea, nausea and intestinal cramping often starting within a few hours of ingestion. Being quite stable, the toxin may remain active even after the contaminating bacteria are killed. It can withstand boiling at 100 °C for a few minutes. Gastroenteritis occurs because SEB is a superantigen, causing the immune system to release a large amount of cytokines that lead to significant inflammation.

Additionally, this protein is one of the causative agents of toxic shock syndrome.

Function

The function of this protein is to facilitate the infection of the host organism. It is a virulence factor designed to induce pathogenesis. One of the major virulence exotoxins is the toxic shock syndrome toxin (TSST), which is secreted by the organism upon successful invasion. It causes a major inflammatory response in the host via superantigenic properties, and is the causative agent of toxic shock syndrome.  It functions as a superantigen through activation of a significant fraction of T-cells (up to 20%) by cross-linking MHC class II molecules with T-cell receptors. TSST is a multisystem illness with several symptoms such as high fever, hypotension, dizziness, rash and peeling skin.

Structure 

All of these toxins share a similar two-domain fold (N and C-terminal domains) with a long alpha-helix in the middle of the molecule, a characteristic beta-barrel known as the "oligosaccharide/oligonucleotide fold" at the N-terminal domain and a beta-grasp motif at the C-terminal domain. Each superantigen possesses slightly different binding mode(s) when it interacts with MHC class II molecules or the T-cell receptor.

N-terminal domain 

The N-terminal domain is also referred to as OB-fold, or in other words the oligonuclucleotide binding fold. This region contains a low-affinity major histocompatibility complex class II (MHC II) site which causes an inflammatory response.

The N-terminal domain contains regions involved in Major Histocompatibility Complex class II association. It is a five stranded beta barrel that forms an OB fold.

C-terminal domain 

The beta-grasp domain has some structural similarities to the beta-grasp motif present in immunoglobulin-binding domains, ubiquitin, 2Fe-2 S ferredoxin and translation initiation factor 3 as identified by the SCOP database.

References 

Protein families
Virulence factors
Protein domains
Inflammations
Bacterial toxins
Biological toxin weapons
Superantigens